Holocarpha obconica, commonly known as the San Joaquin tarweed, is a North American plant species in the sunflower family. It is endemic to (found only in) California, primarily in the Central Valley and adjacent regions.

The epithet "obconica" means "obconical," in other words, shaped like a cone but with the widest part farthest from the base. Achenes of H. obconica are obconical. The plant is a resin-containing herb up to 120 cm (4 feet) tall. It produces numerous flower heads, each head containing 4–9 yellow ray flowers surrounding 11–21 small yellow disc flowers, the disc flowers having yellow or brown anthers.

References

External links
photo of herbarium specimen at Missouri Botanical Garden, collected in Alameda County in 1933, isotype of Holocarpha obconica
Calphotos photo gallery, University of California

Madieae
Endemic flora of California
Plants described in 1935